This is the discography of Michael Giacchino, an American composer.

Films

1990s

2000s

2010s

2020s

Television series

Short films and holiday specials

Video games

Theme park attractions

References

External links
 
 

Film and television discographies
Jazz discographies